Michael Rudman (born 11 October 1954) is an Austrian ice hockey player. He competed in the men's tournament at the 1984 Winter Olympics.

References

1954 births
Living people
Austrian ice hockey players
Olympic ice hockey players of Austria
Ice hockey players at the 1984 Winter Olympics
Sportspeople from Graz
20th-century Austrian people